Ramanathan College ( Irāmanātaṉ Kallūri) is a provincial school in Maruthanarmadam near Chunnakam, Sri Lanka.

The singer Maharajapuram Santhanam was once its principal.

See also
 List of schools in Northern Province, Sri Lanka

References

External links
 Ramanathan College

Girls' schools in Sri Lanka
Provincial schools in Sri Lanka
Schools in Jaffna District